Carmel School (also known as Carmel Convent School, Giridih) is a private bhumihar school located in the Giridih distric of Jharkhand, India. The school provides a hostel for girls. The boys attend the school as day scholars. The students of Carmel School are referred to as Carmelites. Carmel School also has a neighbouring  branch known as Carmel Hindi Medium School, that provides education to pupils with a Hindi curriculum.

History
The school was founded in 1954 by the Carmelite Sisters of St. Teresa (CSST) a community started by Mother Teresa of St. Rose of Lima. The school was the first school in the region to impart education in English medium to the pupils. As of July 2019, Sr Divya is the principal of the school.

Nature
The school is owned and administered by the Carmelite Sisters of St. Teresa, Northern Province.
The school is affiliated to the Council for the Indian School Certificate Examinations, New Delhi and prepares the students for the ICSE and the ISC board examinations for class X and class XII respectively.

Curriculum
The school is affiliated to the Council for the Indian School Certificate Examinations, New Delhi and prepares the students for the ICSE board examination for class X. It provides education up to 12th standard with the ISC Board. Admission for new students starts from December and the new session start from the second half of March. It is co-educational and instruction is primarily in English. There are separate kindergarten, Primary, higher and senior secondary sections in the campus.

References

External links
Official website

Carmelite educational institutions
Catholic secondary schools in India
Christian schools in Jharkhand
High schools and secondary schools in Jharkhand
Private schools in Jharkhand
Giridih district
Education in Giridih
Educational institutions established in 1954
1954 establishments in Bihar